Yakov Vyacheslavovich Trenin (born 13 January 1997) is a Russian professional ice hockey forward currently playing for the Nashville Predators of the National Hockey League (NHL).

Playing career
Trenin was drafted 55th overall by the Nashville Predators in the 2015 NHL Entry Draft and attended their Development Camp that summer. After the draft, Predators North American Amateur Scout J-P Glaude said: "He’s a big center, who plays a solid two-way game...I see him as a complete, top-two center that can put points on the board and the coaches will love to have because he can play in any situation." In July, Trenin signed a three year entry-level contract with the Predators. After signing the contract, Trenin was re-assigned to the Gatineau Olympiques in the Quebec Major Junior Hockey League out of training camp.

Trenin recorded his first career NHL goal on December 7, 2019 in a 6–4 win over the New Jersey Devils, becoming the 184th player in franchise history to score a goal.

Career statistics

Regular season and playoffs

International

References

External links

1997 births
Living people
Sportspeople from Chelyabinsk
Gatineau Olympiques players
Milwaukee Admirals players
Nashville Predators draft picks
Nashville Predators players
Russian ice hockey centres
SKA Saint Petersburg players